Anthony "Tony" DeSpirito (December 24, 1935 – May 26, 1975) was a champion American Thoroughbred horse racing jockey who found instant fame when he won the national riding title in 1952 as an apprentice in his first full year of racing.

Born in Lawrence, Massachusetts, Tony DeSpirito was the son of a millworker. He left school at an early age to work as an exercise rider at Rockingham Park in Salem, New Hampshire. There are conflicting newspaper reports of his birth year but the United States Social Security Death Index records him as being born in 1935. DeSpirito rode his first race as an apprentice jockey in 1951 at Narragansett Park in Pawtucket, Rhode Island.

1952 Championship
In 1952, DeSpirito began his record-setting year well behind other American jockeys in races won, as he did not get his first win until January 22 at Sunshine Park in Oldsmar, Florida. He then began winning at  a tremendous pace and had several racedays with multiple victories. During the week of June 6–13, three times Despirito rode four winners on a single racecard at Suffolk Downs. At Rockingham Park he rode six winners on August 21, 1952, and won six races again at Rockingham on October 10, 1953. On November 29, 1952, he rode five winners on a single card at Lincoln Downs in Rhode Island. By December, he was in a position to challenge the world record for wins in a year. That month, he rode in Florida; when the tracks there closed on Sunday, he flew  to Cuba and won three races on December 28 at Oriental Park Racetrack. On December 30, 1952, he rode his 389th winner at Tropical Park Race Track in Coral Gables, Florida, breaking the record for most wins in a single year set by Walter Miller in 1906. DeSpirito ended the year with 390 wins from 1,474 mounts, a 26% win rate. On the last day of the year, he was flown from Miami to New York so that he could appear on CBS's Toast of the Town with Ed Sullivan.

In 1953, DeSpirito continued his winning ways but was involved in the first of four serious accidents that profoundly affected his career and saw the media dub him the "hard luck jockey". Despite time lost as a result of his 1953 accident, he finished the year with 311 wins but was well behind Bill Shoemaker, who smashed Despirito's record with 485 wins. On November 1, 1953, DeSpirito married Doris De Christoforo in a church ceremony in Revere, Massachusetts.

DeSpirito won the 1954 Kentucky Oaks aboard the Maine Chance Farm filly Fascinator. In his only Kentucky Derby appearance, he finished 13th in the 1954 edition aboard the Maine Chance colt Black Metal. During 1954, DeSpirito battled with riding greats Avelino Gomez and Bill Shoemaker for top jockey honors in the United States and by July 10 had taken over the lead with 176 wins. However, in August, Shoemaker took the lead and maintained it for the rest of the year.

On September 18, 1955, DeSpirito suffered a traumatic brain injury in a racing accident at New York's Aqueduct Racetrack. He returned to racing in January 1956; in May, he was hurt again in an accident at Laurel Park Racecourse and had to undergo surgery to remove a damaged kidney and spleen.

Henry Wajda's heroism
In 1960, DeSpirito rode in his second and final Preakness Stakes, obtaining his best result with a second-place finish aboard the future Canadian Horse Racing Hall of Fame colt Victoria Park. 

On June 30 of that year, DeSpirito came close to losing his life in a racing mishap at Suffolk Downs. After being knocked off his saddle in the first turn, he was left dangling from one stirrup and clinging to the horse's neck. In what the Jockeys' Guild described as "one of the most heroic feats ever seen in American racing history", jockey Henry Wajda rode up beside DeSpirito's horse and reached over with his left hand to lift him back up into the saddle. Wajda lost his own life from injuries sustained in a July 28, 1973, racing accident at Rockingham Park.

DeSpirito continued to ride until April 1973, when he began work as a track patrol judge at Naragansett Park. On May 26, 1975, 39-year-old DeSpirito was found dead in his Riverside, Rhode Island, apartment. Police ruled out foul play, and the coroner's report found he had choked to death.

References

1935 births
1975 deaths
American jockeys
American Champion jockeys
Sportspeople from Lawrence, Massachusetts